The tchoukball competition at the 2009 World Games took place from July 24 to July 26, at the National Kaohsiung Normal University Gymnasium in Kaohsiung, Taiwan.

Men

Preliminary round

Play Offs

5th place match

Bronze medal match

Gold medal match

Women

Preliminary round

Play Offs

Bronze medal match

Gold medal match

External links
 2009 World Games – Tchoukball

2009 World Games